The AACTA Award for Best Production Design is an award presented by the Australian Academy of Cinema and Television Arts (AACTA), a non-profit organisation whose aim is to "identify, award, promote and celebrate Australia's greatest achievements in film and television." The award is presented at the annual AACTA Awards, which hand out accolades for achievements in feature film, television, documentaries and short films. From 1976 to 2010, the category was presented by the Australian Film Institute (AFI), the academy's parent organisation, at the annual Australian Film Institute Awards (known as the AFI Awards). When the AFI launched the academy in 2011, it changed the annual ceremony to the AACTA Awards, with the current award being a continuum of the AFI Award for Best Production Design.

Best Production Design was first presented as Best Art Direction in 1977. The name changed to its current one in 1983. The award is presented to the production designer of a film that is Australian-made, or with a significant amount of Australian content.

References

P
Awards for best art direction